Carmel Catholic High School is a co-educational, college preparatory, Catholic high school run jointly by the priests and brothers of the Order of Carmelites and the Sisters of Charity of the Blessed Virgin Mary.  Located in Mundelein, Illinois, Carmel serves all of Lake County, as well as some of the surrounding counties, and southern Wisconsin.  An institution of the Roman Catholic Archdiocese of Chicago, Carmel Catholic is one of three Carmelite-run high schools in the Chicago area, the others being Joliet Catholic High School and Mount Carmel High School.

History
In the early 1960s, the Carmelites and the Sisters of Charity were asked to build separate but similar Catholic high schools for the northern part of the Archdiocese of Chicago;  an area corresponding roughly to Lake County.  The boys school opened in 1962, with the girls school opening the next year. Following a lengthy planning process, the decision was made by the Carmelites and the BVM Sisters to combine the two schools and establish a Board of Directors. This was done beginning in the 1988–89 school year.

Awards and recognition
In 1985, 1996, 2002, 2007, and 2021 Carmel Catholic High School was recognized with the Blue Ribbon School Award of Excellence by the United States Department of Education.

Academics
The school offers 20 Advanced Placement (AP) courses:  Biology, Chemistry, Physics (C: Mechanics), U.S. Government and Politics, U.S. History, European History, World History, English Language, English Literature, Spanish Language, French Language, Latin, Studio Art, Music Theory, Calculus AB, Calculus BC, Statistics, Psychology, Microeconomics, and Macroeconomics.

Demographics
The demographic breakdown of the 1,318 students enrolled in 2015-16 was:
Native American/Alaskan - 0.2%
Asian - 5.0%
Black - 2.5%
Hispanic - 6.6%
White - 80.0%
Native Hawaiian/Pacific islanders - 0.5%
Multiracial - 5.2%

Athletics
Carmel's athletic teams are named Corsairs, and the school's colors are brown, gold, and white.  Carmel competes in the East Suburban Catholic Conference in its interscholastic athletics program.

The school sponsors both men's and women's teams in basketball, cross country, golf, lacrosse, soccer, swimming, tennis, track and field, and volleyball.  The school sponsors men's teams in baseball, football, and wrestling, and women's teams in cheerleading, gymnastics, pom poms, and softball. Although not sponsored by the IHSA, the school also sponsors a men's ice hockey team.

The following teams have won their respective IHSA sponsored state tournament:

 Football: 2003
 Girls gymnastics: 1992, 1993, 2010, 2011, 2012
 Girls soccer: 2015
 Basketball (Girls): 2022

Fine arts
Carmel Catholic's fine arts program includes chorus, band, drama, and visual arts.

The drama program produces one play and one musical per year.  The school's current long-range strategic plan includes the construction of a new fine arts wing by 2012. The Fine Arts wing was opened in 2013. The drama program is a troupe of the International Thespian Society and has had students participate in the Illinois High School Theatre Festival.

The choral program has a number of different choirs for students to join: Concert Choir, Treble Choir, Advanced Choir, as well as one show choir, Cadence, and one jazz/ a cappella group, Parkway Singers.

In the band program there are many different groups: The Jazz Band, Jazz Ensemble, Concert Band and Wind Ensemble. During the football season, the Marching Band plays at all home games and at as many playoff games they can get to.

Notable alumni

 Marietta DePrima (1982) is an actress (The Hughleys).
Sean McGrath (2006) played for the NFL's Los Angeles Chargers
 Brienne Minor (2015) is an NCAA champion tennis player who competed in the 2017 U.S. Open
 Al Salvi (1978) was a former Illinois state legislator and 1996 Republican U.S. Senate nominee
 Chris Salvi (2008) is a former football safety who played for Notre Dame
 Rick Santorum (1976) was a United States senator (R—PA) (1995–2007)
 Scott Stahoviak (1988) was a Major League Baseball first baseman and first round draft pick (1991) for the Minnesota Twins
Frank C Sup IV (1997) Professor at the University of Massachusetts Amherst
 Carol Tyler (1969) is an internationally known artist, cartoonist and humorist 
 Joe Tyler (1966) was an Olympic athlete who rode as brakeman on USA #1 bobsled in the 1980 Winter Olympics 
 Mike Wagner (1967) was an NFL safety for the Pittsburgh Steelers who played for their championship teams in Super Bowls IX, X, XIII, and XIV; he was a member of their "Steel Curtain" defense
 Alex Young (2012) is a pitcher for the Cincinnati Reds of Major League Baseball.
 Jeff Zgonina (1988) was an NFL player for the Houston Texans and is an assistant coach for the San Francisco 49ers

References

External links
Carmel Catholic High School official website

Educational institutions established in 1962
1962 establishments in Illinois
Roman Catholic Archdiocese of Chicago
Catholic secondary schools in Illinois
Carmelite educational institutions
Mundelein, Illinois
Schools in Lake County, Illinois